NGC 1019 is a barred spiral galaxy approximately 316 million light-years away from Earth in the constellation of Cetus. It was discovered by French astronomer Édouard Stephan on December 1, 1880 with the 31" reflector at the Marseille Observatory.

NGC 1019 is classified as Type I Seyfert galaxy. Its nuclei is surrounded by tight rings or annuli of star formation, and the rings contain compact, young star clusters.

See also 
 List of NGC objects (1001–2000)

References

External links 
 
 
 SEDS

Barred spiral galaxies
Cetus (constellation)
1019
10006
Astronomical objects discovered in 1880
Discoveries by Édouard Stephan